Karin or Carin is a common feminine given name in various Germanic languages (geographically including Austria, Germany, Netherlands, Scandinavia, and Switzerland), and Estonia and Slovenia, and in some French-speaking areas, as well as Japanese.

In most of its Western forms, Karin was originally a Swedish form of Katherine, but in English speaking countries is usually thought of as an alternate spelling for Karen.

The Japanese name Karin (花梨, かりん) means Chinese quince (Pseudocydonia sinensis), quince (Cydonia oblonga) or Burmese rosewood (Pterocarpus indicus) and is unrelated to the Western forms.

In Thailand, it is written as กา ริน and read as 'karin'.  However, in Thailand it is mainly used as a male name.

People

Karin Aasma (1926–2012), Estonian-Swedish art historian
Karin Abma (born 1951), Dutch rower
Karin Adelmund (1949–2005), Dutch politician
Karin Adelsköld (born 1973), Swedish comedian and television presenter
Karin Ageman (1899–1950), Swedish artist
Karin Ahlbäck, Finnish Scouting activist
Karin Åhlin (1830–1899), Swedish educator
Karin Ahrland (1931–2019), Swedish politician and diplomat
Karin Albou (born 1968), French director
Karin Alfredsson (born 1953), Swedish writer
Karin Alvtegen (born 1965), Swedish writer of crime fiction
Karin Andersen (born 1952), Norwegian politician
Karin Barber (born 1949), British anthropologist and academic
Karin Boye (1900–1941), Swedish poet and novelist
Karin Dahmen (born 1969), German physicist
Karin Dreijer (born 1975), Swedish singer
Karin Du Rietz (1766–1788), Swedish Royal Guard
Karin Enke (born 1961), German speed skater
Karin Ersdotter (1829–1902) Swedish businesswoman. 
Karin Falck (born 1932), Swedish director.
Karin Fossum (born 1954), Norwegian writer of crime fiction
Karin Glenmark (born 1952), Swedish singer
Karin Guthke (born 1956), German diver
Karin Illgen (born 1941), German discus thrower
Karin Jota (fl. 1350), Legendary Medieval Swedish female official of the court
Karin Keller-Sutter, Swiss German politician
Karin Kirkpatrick, Canadian politician
Karin Kjølbro (born 1944), Faroese politician
Karin Knapp (born 1987), Italian tennis player
Karin Kock-Lindberg (1891–1976), Swedish politician 
Karin Krog (born 1937), Norwegian jazz vocalist
Karin Lannby (1916–2007), Swedish actress and spy
Karin Lenzke (born 1936), German high jumper
Karin Lindberg (1929–2020), Swedish gymnast
Karin Månsdotter (1550–1612), Queen of Sweden
Karin McRobert, (born 1953) Australian basketball player
, Japanese fencer
Karin Kei Nagano (born 1998), American pianist
Karin Ontiveros (born 1988), Mexican model and beauty queen
Karin Rask (born 1979), Estonian actress 
Karin Rodrigues (born 1971), Brazilian volleyball player
Karin Schnass (born 1980), Austrian mathematician
Karin Shifrin, Romanian/Israeli Mezzo-Soprano
Karin Smith (born 1955), American javelin thrower 
Karin Smyth (born 1964), British politician 
Karin Söder (1928–2015), Swedish politician
Karin Stahre-Janson, Swedish ship captain
, Japanese manga artist
Karin Tammaru (born 1971), Estonian actress 
Karin Viard (born 1966), French actress
Karin Yrvin (born 1970), Norwegian politician 
Karin Zielinski (born 1982), Peruvian musician

Fictional characters
, a character in Dragon Ball media
, character in the Naruto anime/manga
, a character in the manga series DNA²
, a character in the media project Nijigasaki High School Idol Club
, eponymous character in the manga Kamichama Karin
, character from the video game Street Fighter Alpha 3
, character in the game Shadow Hearts: Covenant
, character in anime/manga Yuki Yuna is a Hero
, character in the anime/manga Bleach
, protagonist of the anime/manga Chibi Vampire
 or Kayla, character in anime/manga Fighting Foodons
Karin Saku (佐久 (in kanji form), かりん (in hiragana form), or カリン (original + katakana form), a character in Magical Trans!
, character in the game To Heart 2

See also

Karie (name)
Karen (disambiguation)
Karien
Carin

Brazilian given names
Feminine given names
German feminine given names
Japanese feminine given names
Norwegian feminine given names
Swedish feminine given names
Danish feminine given names
Dutch feminine given names
Estonian feminine given names
English feminine given names
Scottish feminine given names